Cupillari may refer to:

Antonella Cupillari (born 1955), Italian-American mathematician
Cupillari Observatory, astronomical observatory operated by Keystone College in Pennsylvania